Jodhe is a village located near the Beas River. It is surrounded by four villages: Bal Sarai, Sathiala, Butala and Seron.  Most of the population residing here work as farmers and mostly live on farms.

History
Jodhe borrows its name from the fact that great warriors were born at this place. That why it is called Jodhe (Warriors).

Gurdwara Baba Batha Sahib Ji

Gurdwara Baba Batha Sahib Ji - Jodhe is  a Religious Place situated in Village Jodhe in the name of 108 Baba Gopal Das Ji . Fair (Mela) is held twice a year in the month of March and August.

Address

Village - Jodhe
Tehsil - Baba Bakala
City - Amritsar
State - Punjab

Villages in Amritsar district